Pigment Yellow 16 is an organic compound that is classified as a diarylide pigment.  

Pigment Yellow 16 is used as a yellow colorant, and is classified as an arylide yellow.  Also called permanent yellow, its color index number is 20040. The compound is obtained via acetoacetylation of o-tolidine using diketene. The resulting bisacetoacetylated compound is coupled with two equiv of the diazonium salt obtained from 2,4-dichloroaniline.

References

Biphenyls
Organic pigments
Shades of yellow
Chloroarenes
Diarylide pigments